Minnesota State Highway 371 (MN 371) is a  highway in central and north-central Minnesota.  The route connects Minnesota's northern lakes region with the central part of the state.  It runs south–north from U.S. Highway 10 (US 10) in Little Falls to US 2 in Cass Lake.  MN 371 has become a heavily traveled arterial route that was once a two-lane roadway over almost all of its length, but has been widened to four lanes across most of its southern half.  Much of the traffic utilizing the route is Twin Cities-based traffic heading to their cabins on one of the many northern lakes.

Route description

MN 371 serves as a south–north route in central and north-central Minnesota between Little Falls, Baxter, Brainerd, Nisswa, Pequot Lakes, Walker, and Cass Lake.

Highway 371 departs from US 10 at Little Falls heading to the north, paralleling the Mississippi River on the east side of the river.  MN 371 is a freeway-standard route coming off of US 10 as it passes on the west side of the industrial sector of Little Falls.  The first interchange heading northbound is with Morrison County Road 46 (CR 46), which is the only interchange within the Little Falls area for the freeway portion.

After Little Falls the route enters rural farmland, which will characterize the rest of the freeway portion of the route. The next interchange for Highway 371 is near the Fort Ripley military base where it meets MN 115 and CR 47 at a diamond interchange.  MN 115 serves the military base to the west; a large tank used as a monument is located on the east side of the interchange.  It formerly sat on the west side of Highway 371 before the interchange with Highway 115 was built in the early 2000s.  This interchange with Highway 115 was the final piece to be completed in the Highway 371 freeway upgrade.

The Highway 371 freeway ends a few miles north of Highway 115 at CR 48, but maintains a four-lane divided highway configuration.  North of CR 48, Highway 371 crosses into Crow Wing County and enters the town of Fort Ripley, spending a short time passing through the center of the small town.  The highway quickly leaves Fort Ripley and continues north as the landscape steadily becomes less farm-oriented and more forested.  After Fort Ripley the highway turns to the northeast for several miles and clips the southeast corner of Crow Wing State Park.

A few more miles to the northeast, Highway 371 intersects Business Highway 371; this is the Brainerd exit. In the year 2000, Highway 371 was moved onto the C. Elmer Anderson Memorial Highway, which bypasses Brainerd to the west, and the old roadway into downtown Brainerd was redesignated Business Highway 371.  Highway 371 itself turns back to the north and crosses the Mississippi River before entering Baxter, a smaller city just to the west of Brainerd.  In Baxter, MN 371 intersects MN 210, another major arterial route for northern Minnesota.  Highway 371 heads north through the business district of Baxter, then enters the Gull Lake area, a popular tourist destination.

Highway 371 crosses an intersection with CR 77 and CR 48. CR 77 is a three-quarter loop around Gull Lake to the west, while Highway 371 makes up the eastern quarter.  Highway 371 passes north past several lakes along with many resorts, and reaches the town of Nisswa at a junction with CR 77 and CR 13; CR 13 goes into Nisswa, while CR 77 will take one back around Gull Lake to the west.  Highway 371 remains as a four lane divided highway, as the landscape becomes noticeably more forested.

The next town on the route is Pequot Lakes, most famous for its fishing bobber water tower. Highway 371 exceeds freeway standards from the intersection with CR 107 to the intersection with CR 112 and Patriot Avenue. Right after the intersection with CR 16, Highway 371 turns into a two lane road (one lane in each direction). The road leaves the otherwise small town behind quickly.  Several miles north of Pequot Lakes and after passing through the small town of Jenkins, MN 371 enters Cass County.

The forested landscape subsides for a short while as Highway 371 comes to the town of Pine River, the largest town on the route between Brainerd and Walker, and here Highway 371 intersects the southern terminus of MN 84.  Highway 84 heads to the northeast to Chickamaw Beach and Longville while Highway 371 continues due north.

The forests return as Highway 371 reaches the town of Backus, located on Pine Mountain Lake, where it meets MN 87 for a short concurrency. Highway 371 and Highway 200 begin an  concurrency at this intersection; Highway 371 north and Highway 200 west continue to the northwest together as they pass around Walker Bay, the western arm of Leech Lake, one of the largest lakes in Minnesota. The two pass the former Ah-gwah-ching facility, which was serviced by the unsigned MN 290.

Highway 371 and Highway 200 concurrently reach downtown Walker, a town where travelers can find most amenities. Also in Walker is the eastern terminus of MN 34, which provides the main route between Walker, Park Rapids, and Detroit Lakes to the west.

Several miles northwest of Walker, Highway 200 splits off Highway 371, heading west towards Lake Itasca while Highway 371 stays heading north.  Highway 371 will not intersect any more state highways on its mainline routing after this intersection. Meanwhile, the landscape now becomes less treelined and more hilly as the route progresses towards Cass Lake, the final city on Highway 371.  The route enters Cass Lake from the south, passes through downtown and ends at U.S. Highway 2 just north of downtown, although the roadway itself continues north as a local street.

Memorial designations
 On August 7, 2006, the highway was dedicated as the Purple Heart Memorial Highway in honor of veterans who have been wounded or died in combat.
 Until 2005, most of Highway 371, except for the Brainerd bypass, was also officially designated the Paul Bunyan Expressway.  This was a unique name designation because the portion of Highway 371 from Pequot Lakes to Cass Lake is not built to expressway standards.
 The  portion of Highway 371 bypass around Brainerd is officially designated the C. Elmer Anderson Memorial Highway.

State Park
Crow Wing State Park is located near Highway 371 at the confluence of the Mississippi and Crow Wing Rivers.  The park is located nine miles south of Brainerd and Baxter.  The park entrance is located one mile west of the junction of Highway 371 and County Road 27.  The entrance is on County Road 27.

History

Minnesota 371 was originally designated as US 371 from 1931 to 1973. During 1973, US 371 was re-designated Minnesota 371. The former US 371 designation was concurrent with US 2 from 1931 to 1973 between Cass Lake and Bemidji with a terminus at US 71.

Subsequently, US 371 was recycled and reassigned to a concatenation of state highways in Arkansas and Louisiana to form a new US 371 in 1994.  The current US 371 has no relationship to the old US 371 (now Minnesota 371) other than being associated with US 71 as the parent number.

Improvements
For the most part Highway 371 has been a high-volume, two-lane highway.  Because of increases in traffic, especially during times of peak recreational demand, Highway 371 has been the focus of many highway upgrades in the area:
 In 2005, the remaining segment of the project that converted Highway 371 to a four-lane expressway from Little Falls to Baxter was completed.  This project included a bypass of Brainerd, which opened in the year 2000.  The old route through Brainerd is now bannered as Highway 371 Business.
 Plans are also in the works to upgrade the  segment of Highway 371 from Nisswa to Pine River to a four-lane expressway. No date has been announced for its continued expansion as of May 2020.

Major intersections

Highway 371 Business

Before the opening of the Brainerd bypass in the year 2000, Old Highway 371 went through downtown Brainerd and then proceeded west on a two-mile (3 km) concurrency with Highway 210 before resuming north at its current intersection in Baxter.  Due to the addition of new highway mileage from the new bypass, the old route of Highway 371 was a candidate for turnback to local jurisdiction.  Because of local preference to keep the old routing of Highway 371 as part of the state trunk highway system, it was agreed that portions of other highways in the surrounding area would be turnbacked instead: MN 18 from MN 210 to MN 25, and the two-block long MN 322 would be given to the city of Brainerd maintenance, and MN 25 north of MN 210 to its terminus at Merrifield would be given to Crow Wing County maintenance as an extension of CR 3. The route of Old Highway 371 that had gone through downtown Brainerd and then proceeded west to Baxter was then redesignated Highway 371 Business in the year 2000.  The business route is five miles (8.0 km) in length.

See also

References

External links

371
71-3
371
Transportation in Morrison County, Minnesota
Transportation in Crow Wing County, Minnesota
Transportation in Cass County, Minnesota